Tunnerstad is a locality situated on the island of Visingsö in Jönköping Municipality, Jönköping County, Sweden, and had 295 inhabitants in 2010.

References

External links

Populated places in Jönköping Municipality